The Fender Bantam Bass was a bass amplifier made by Fender. It was introduced in 1969. This silverfaced amp used an asymmetrical trapezoidal Yamaha speaker using a white styrofoam cone, and so the speakers blew very easily. As a result, the amp was not a commercial success, and it is rare to find a Bantam Bass today that still has its original speaker. The Bantam tone circuit was used in the Bassman 10 combo amps, introduced in 1972, but these were barely good enough to compete with the other amps available at the time.

References

 Teagle, J. and Sprung, J.: Fender Amps: The First Fifty Years
 GGJaguar's Guitarium and Ampeteria: 1970 Bantam Bass
 1969-1971 Bantam Bass
 Fender Bantam Bass Amp: Harmony Central Reviews

Instrument amplifiers
B